China Medical Board, Inc. (CMB) is a nonprofit organization that promotes health education and research in the medical universities of China and Southeast Asia. Its mission is "to advance health, equity, and the quality of care in China and Southeast Asia."

History
The Board was founded in 1914 as the second major project of the Rockefeller Foundation. With additional endowments from the Rockefeller Foundation, China Medical Board became an independent private foundation in 1928. From 1914 to 1951, CMB worked to establish Peking Union Medical College. Its goal from the outset was full Chinese ownership, operations, financing, and faculty at Peking Union Medical College, which was achieved in 1950.

In 1951, China Medical Board could not operate in China for political reasons. During this time, China Medical Board focused its attention on advancing public health in other countries in East Asia and Southeast Asia. In 1980, it resumed activities in China and has been a continuous presence in China ever since.

Over the years, China Medical Board has supported 118 medical schools in 17 Asian countries, 28 of which are in China. Its work has focused on capacity building by providing facilities, educational material, laboratories, fellowships, and faculty development. In total, China Medical Board is estimated to have invested $1–5 billion in fostering public health in Asia. The current president of China Medical Board is Dr. Lincoln Chen, who is compensated over $400,000 annually plus benefits. Some controversies arose in 2014 regarding inappropriateness use of funds arose in 2014 with a settlement to the director of business operations. Currently, China Medical Board has over $300 million invested

Activities
Today, China Medical Board focuses on health policy and systems reform and medical professional education reform. It works with 24 medical universities throughout China and in parts of Southeast Asia, including Thailand, Vietnam, Laos, and Myanmar.

See also
Rockefeller Foundation
:Category:Medical schools in China
Healthcare system reform in the People's Republic of China
Violence against doctors in China

Bibliography
 Laurie Norris. (2003). The China Medical Board: 50 years of programs, partnerships, and progress, 1950-2000.
 Mary E. Ferguson. (1970). China Medical Board and Peking Union Medical College: A chronicle of fruitful collaboration 1914-1951.
 China Medical Commission of the Rockefeller Foundation, Medicine in China, 1914. full text
 Bowers, John Z. (1972). Western medicine in a Chinese palace: Peking Union Medical College, 1917-1951. The Josiah Macy Jr. Foundation.
 Bullock, Mary Brown. (1980). An American Transplant: The Rockefeller Foundation and Peking Union Medical College. University of California Press. .
 Bullock, Mary Brown. (2011). The Oil Prince's Legacy: Rockefeller Philanthropy in China. Woodrow Wilson Center Press. .
 Andrews, Bridie and Mary Brown Bullock, eds. (2014). Medical Transitions in Twentieth-Century China. Indiana University Press. 978-0-253-01490-0.
 Ryan, Jennifer, Lincoln Chen, and Tony Saich. (2014). Philanthropy for Health in China. Indiana University Press. 978-0-253-01450-4.
 Harper, Tim and Sunil S. Amrith. (2014). Histories of Health in Southeast Asia: Perspectives on the Long Twentieth Century. Indiana University Press. 978-0-253-01491-7.

References

External links
Official Website
China Medical Board exhibit at the Rockefeller Foundation 100th Website

Medical and health organizations based in China
Rockefeller Foundation